Black matriarchy is a term for the black American families mostly led by women.

First usage 
The issue was first brought to national attention in 1965 by sociologist and later Democratic Senator Daniel Patrick Moynihan, in the Moynihan Report (also known as "The Negro Family: The Case For National Action"). Moynihan's report made the argument that the relative absence of nuclear families (those having both a father and mother present) in Black America would greatly hinder further Black socioeconomic progress.

Statistics 
A study of 1880 family structure in Philadelphia shows that three-quarters of Black families were nuclear families, composed of two parents and children. In New York City in 1925, 85 percent of kin-related Black households had two parents. In 1940, the illegitimacy rate for Black children was 19 percent.

When Moynihan warned in his 1965 report of the coming destruction of the Black family, the out-of-wedlock birthrate was 25 percent among Blacks. By 1991, 68 percent of Black children were born outside of marriage. In 2011, 72 percent of Black babies were born to unwed mothers.

Negativity 

Some will disagree with the idea of a Black matriarchy because they see Black matriarchy being used in a derogatory way.  The author of the article "The Myth of the Black Matriarchy" argues that black women were seen in a threatening way and their position in the family has resulted in the psychological castration of the black male and has produced a variety of other negative effects. These negative effects include low educational achievements, personality disorders, juvenile delinquency, etc.

Effects of absent fathers 

2011 Census Bureau data compiled by Kids Count, a project of the Annie E. Casey Foundation, shows that about 67% of black children are living in a household without their father.  Fathers play an emotional role in families, and their absence can be detrimental to the development of their children. For young girls the absence of their fathers can influence how promiscuous the daughter is with her physical sexuality. Also they may seek more attention from men and tend to have had more physical contact with boys than other girls their age. It has been shown that boys without fathers tend to become gang affiliated more than those who have a two parent home. In the oral survey the writer conducted with 25 black males ages 15 to 25 who had either been to jail, or on probation, or had a criminal record or had criminal charges 13 pending, it was found that 21 out of the 25 subjects were raised by a single mother. Seventeen of them said they thought that if their fathers were present during their upbringing, it could have made a difference in their lives. These theories have been challenged by various collected data, including data shown by the Center for Disease Control (CDC).

See also 

 Matrifocal family
 Research on the African-American Family
 The Negro Family: The Case For National Action
 Is Marriage for White People?

General:
 African-American family structure

References

Notes 
 Collins, Patricia. "Black Women and Motherhood." Black Feminist Thought, second edition 171-199.
 Feldstein, Ruth. "I Wanted the Whole World to See." Not June Cleaver, Women and Gender in Postwar America 1945-1960 (1994): 261-305.
 Rosen, Lawrence. Matriarchy and Lower Class Negro Male Delinquency. University of California Press.
 Collins, Patricia Hill (2009). Black Feminist Thought. Routledge. pp. 84–85. .
 Herman, Ellen (1995). The Romance of American Psychology: Political Culture in the Age of Experts. pp. 190–191. .
 Christensen, Bryce. "Time for a New 'Moynihan Report'? Confronting the National Family Crisis". The Howard Center for Family, Religion, and Society. The Howard Center for Family, Religion, and Society, October 2004. Retrieved November 12, 2012.
 DeSeno, Tommy. "Black Kids In Asbury Park Shooting Each Other, Part One: Why It's Happening". More Monmouth Musing. TriCityNews, April 12, 2012. Retrieved November 12, 2012.
 Nyong'o, Tavia. "Tavia Nyong'o, "Barack Hussein Obama, Or, The Name of the Father". S&F Online. Barnard Center For Research On Women, April 2009. Retrieved November 12, 2012. 
 Pramos, M. "The Tangle of Pathology". American in the Sixties. N.p., November 10, 2011. Retrieved November 13, 2012.
 Patricia McBroom. "The Black Matriarchy". Science News, Vol. 94, No. 16 (October 19, 1968), pp. 393–395. Society for Science & the Public.
 Herbert H. Hyman and John Shelton Reed. "'Black Matriarchy' Reconsidered: Evidence From Secondary Analysis of Sample Surveys". The Public Opinion Quarterly, Vol. 33, No. 3 (Autumn, 1969), pp. 346–354.Oxford University Press on behalf of the American Association for Public Opinion Research.
 Mary Louise Anderson."Black Matriarchy: Portrayals of Women in Three Plays". Negro American Literature Forum, Vol. 10, No. 3 (Autumn 1976), pp. 93–95. St. Louis University.
 Katheryn Thomas Dietrich. "A Reexamination of the Myth of Black Matriarchy." Journal of Marriage and Family, Vol. 37, No. 2 (May 1975), pp. 367–374. National Council on Family Relations.
 Melina Abdullah. "Womanist mothering: loving and raising the revolution." The Western Journal of Black Studies, 36.1 (Winter 2012), p. 57.
 Roger H. Rubin. "Adult Liaison in the "Epidemic" of "Teenage" Birth, Pregnancy, and Venereal Disease." The Journal of Sex Research, Vol. 29, No. 4 (November 1992), pp. 525–545.
 Collins, Patricia Hill. "Black Feminist Thought in the Matrix of Domination" .Patricia Hill Collins, Black Feminist Thought in the Matrix of Domination. N.p., n.d. Retrieved December 3, 2012.

African-American culture
African-American gender relations
Family
Parenting
Stereotypes of black women